Patrick Sean Wey (born March 21, 1991) is an American former professional ice hockey defenseman. Before retiring in 2015 he played with the Washington Capitals of the National Hockey League (NHL). Wey was selected by the Capitals in the 4th round (115th overall) of the 2009 NHL Entry Draft.

Playing career
Prior to turning professional, Wey played four seasons (2009-2013) of NCAA Division I hockey with the Boston College Eagles men's ice hockey team, helping Boston College to win the NCAA national championship in both 2010 and 2012.

On April 5, 2013, the Washington Capitals signed Wey to a two-year, entry-level contract, and he began the 2013–14 season in the ECHL with the Reading Royals where he scored three points in eight games. On November 14, 2013. Wey made his AHL debut with the Hershey Bears, scoring his first AHL goal on November 24, 2013.

On December 5, 2013, the Washington Capitals recalled Wey from Hershey, replacing defenseman Tyson Strachan on the NHL roster. On December 10, 2013, after appearing in one game with the Capitals, Wey was reassigned to the Hershey Bears.

On June 29, 2015, Wey announced he  was retiring from professional hockey to pursue educational interests. He stated that the reason for his early retirement are multiple concussions that he suffered within the span of several months, one while playing for the Washington Capitals (fight against Richard Clune) on March 30, 2014, and the second one while playing for the Hershey Bears (elbow to the head by Jay Rosehill) on October 24, 2014.

Career statistics

Regular season and playoffs

International

References

External links
 

1991 births
Living people
American men's ice hockey defensemen
Boston College Eagles men's ice hockey players
Hershey Bears players
Ice hockey people from Pittsburgh
Reading Royals players
Washington Capitals draft picks
Washington Capitals players
Waterloo Black Hawks players